The Atlantic Bowl was one of the two national semifinal men's football games of Canadian Interuniversity Sport (now known as U Sports).  The winner of the Atlantic Bowl would meet the winner of the Churchill Bowl for the Vanier Cup.  It was replaced by the Uteck Bowl in 2001 following the death of Larry Uteck, a former athletic director at Saint Mary's University.

History
The Atlantic Bowl was traditionally a match between the champions of Atlantic University Sport (and its various predecessors) and a conference-winning team from central Canada.  It had been hosted in Halifax, Nova Scotia annually since 1956, often at Huskies Stadium, home to the Saint Mary's Huskies.  There were exceptions to Halifax as the host city. In 1976, the Acadia Axemen hosted the game at Raymond Field. The second was in 1983 when the game was scheduled to be hosted by the Canada West champion. The AUAA withdrew from national competition and participation in the game due to the relocation from Halifax. As a result, the Calgary Dinos advanced to the Vanier Cup by virtue of their Hardy Trophy win over UBC.

The Atlantic Bowl champions would receive the Robert L. Stanfield trophy, a trophy named after the former leader of Her Majesty's Official Opposition.

Traditionally, the winners of Atlantic University Sport would face one of the other three conference champions, with the other two meeting in the Churchill Bowl.

List of Atlantic Bowl Championships

Team Win/Loss records

References

Sport in Halifax, Nova Scotia
U Sports football trophies and awards
Sport in Atlantic Canada
1956 establishments in Nova Scotia
2001 disestablishments in Nova Scotia
Recurring sporting events established in 1956
Recurring sporting events disestablished in 2001